wallplate, wall plate, or wall-plate may refer to:

 Wall plate, in building frame construction
 Wall plate for an electrical outlet or light switch
 Keystone wall plate

See also
 
 
 
 
 
 
 Faceplate (disambiguation)